Benjamin Taylor Cable (August 11, 1853 – December 13, 1923) was an American politician who served one term as a U.S. Representative from Illinois from 1891 to 1893

Life
Born in Georgetown, Kentucky, Cable moved with his parents to Rock Island, Illinois, in September 1856. He attended the public schools and Racine College (now University of Wisconsin–Parkside), Racine, Wisconsin. He was graduated from the University of Michigan at Ann Arbor in 1876. He engaged in agricultural pursuits and also became interested in various manufacturing enterprises.

Political career 
He served as chairman of the western branch of the Democratic National Committee in 1892. He was chairman of the Democratic executive committee in 1902 and served as a delegate to the Democratic National Convention in 1904.

Cable was elected as a Democrat to the Fifty-second Congress (March 4, 1891 – March 3, 1893). He declined to be a candidate for renomination in 1892.

Later career and death 
He engaged in agricultural pursuits as joint owner of a ranch near San Antonio, Texas. He died in Rock Island, Illinois, on December 13, 1923. He was interred in Chippiannock Cemetery.

References

1853 births
1923 deaths
People from Georgetown, Kentucky
Ranchers from Texas
Politicians from Rock Island, Illinois
University of Wisconsin–Parkside alumni
University of Michigan Law School alumni
Democratic Party members of the United States House of Representatives from Illinois